is a Japanese therapist and former actress.

Career
Nakamura debuted in Genjiro Arato's The Girl of the Silence in 1995. She starred in Ryuichi Hiroki's 2000 film, Tokyo Trash Baby. She also appeared in Hiroki's another film, River.

Filmography
 The Girl of the Silence (1995)
 Gohatto (1999)
 Tomie (1999) as Tsukiko Izumisawa
 Tokyo Trash Baby (2000)
 Tales of the Unusual (2000)
 The Mars Canon (2001)
 Blood and Bones (2004)
 Jukai (2004)
 World's End Girlfriend (2005)
 Love Exposure (2008)
 Forgotten Dreams (2011)
 River (2011)

References

External links
 

Japanese actresses
1979 births
Living people